Skorzewo  ({) is a village in the administrative district of Gmina Kościerzyna, within Kościerzyna County, Pomeranian Voivodeship, in northern Poland. It is located within the ethnocultural region of Kashubia in the historic region of Pomerania. 

Here was born Rev. Władysław Szulist.

The village has a population of 1,323.

Skorzewo was a royal village of the Polish Crown, administratively located in the Tczew County in the Pomeranian Voivodeship.

References

Skorzewo
Kościerzyna County